Dmitry Pavlenko (born 1 January 1991) is a Russian handball player for Chekhovskiye Medvedi and the Russian national team.

He competed at the 2016 European Men's Handball Championship.

References

1991 births
Living people
Russian male handball players
People from Zagorje ob Savi